Pellegrino Matarazzo (born November 28, 1977) is an American professional soccer coach who currently manages TSG 1899 Hoffenheim.

He was previously a youth coach of 1. FC Nürnberg and 1899 Hoffenheim. In December 2019, Matarazzo was appointed head coach of VfB Stuttgart. He has lived in Germany since 2000.

Early life
Matarazzo was raised in Fair Lawn, New Jersey to Italian immigrants. He has three younger brothers: Leo, Frank, and Antonio, all of them were in a Napoli fanclub at the time Diego Maradona played there. Leo and Antonio also played at Columbia. He played several sports growing up, including basketball and volleyball due to his height, but saw the most success in soccer, being a four-year varsity starter for Fair Lawn High School, leading them to the state tournament as a senior for the first time in nearly twenty years. He went on to play at Columbia University, where he earned a degree in applied mathematics in 1999.

Playing career
After his graduation from Columbia, Matarazzo decided to go for a career as a professional soccer player. After failed trials at Serie B club Salernitana based in his mother's hometown, Salerno, and Serie C club Juve Stabia in Italy, he signed in Germany's fourth division with Eintracht Bad Kreuznach. Between 2001 to 2005, Matarazzo played for Wehen with a year at Münster for the 2003–2004 season, as well as Wattenscheid and Nürnberg. Later, Matarazzo served as assistant coach while playing for the reserve team at the same time.

Coaching career
Matarazzo worked many years at Nürnberg's academy, coaching the B and A juniors. In 2015, Matarazzo started the German coaching training at the Hennes Weisweiler Akademie, where he shared a room with Julian Nagelsmann. Later, Matarazzo joined Nagelsmann's coaching staff at Hoffenheim in 2017, becoming youth coach there. In 2018, Matarazzo became Nagelsmann's assistant and interfaced between the first team and academy, and stayed there with Alfred Schreuder as head coach. In December 2019, Sven Mislintat signed Matarazzo as first team coach of VfB Stuttgart. He was sacked in October 2022.

On February 8, 2023, Matarazzo returned to TSG 1899 Hoffenheim, this time as manager of the first team. He signed a contract until June 2025, replacing André Breitenreiter.

Managerial statistics

References

External links

1977 births
Living people
Sportspeople from Passaic County, New Jersey
American soccer players
Association football defenders
American people of Italian descent
Fair Lawn High School alumni
People from Fair Lawn, New Jersey
People from Wayne, New Jersey
Soccer players from New Jersey
Sportspeople from Bergen County, New Jersey
Columbia Lions men's soccer players
Regionalliga players
Eintracht Bad Kreuznach players
SV Wehen Wiesbaden players
SC Preußen Münster players
SG Wattenscheid 09 players
1. FC Nürnberg II players
American soccer coaches
Association football coaches
Player-coaches
Italian football managers
Bundesliga managers
2. Bundesliga managers
VfB Stuttgart managers
Columbia University alumni
American expatriate soccer players
Italian expatriate footballers
Italian expatriate football managers
American expatriate soccer coaches
American expatriate sportspeople in Germany
Italian expatriate sportspeople in Germany
Expatriate football managers in Germany
Expatriate footballers in Germany